Glauco Signorini (born 1 January 1913 in Rome) was an Italian professional footballer who played as a midfielder.

He played one game in the Serie A for A.S. Roma in the 1936–37 season.

See also
Football in Italy
List of football clubs in Italy

References

1913 births
Year of death missing
Italian footballers
Serie A players
A.S. Roma players
Association football midfielders